This is a list of radio orchestras with the links in their names, and the native language names in italics (where available).

Current radio orchestras

Americas

Asia

Europe

Defunct radio orchestras

See also
 List of symphony orchestras

References

Radio orchestras

Radio orchestras
Radio orchestras

Orchestras